The Roland S-10 Digital Sampling Keyboard is a 8-voice polyphonic synthesizer, produced by Roland Corporation in 1986. In the following year of 1987, an upgraded rack-mounted version, the Roland S-220 was released. The upgrade doubles the voice amount to 16, with 5 audio outputs, and only a 30kHz sample-rate.

Features
The sampling specs of the keyboard consists of a 12-bit, a sample rate of both 15kHz and 30kHz, an auto-loop function, and MIDI control. The keyboard contains 256k of internal memory, which is divided into 4 banks (equal to 64k per bank). All 4 banks can be utilized simultaneously. The maximum sample time allotted is 4.4 seconds (1.1 seconds per bank). Effects are stackable and can be combined for up to five effects to be used at the same time. Samples can be stored and loaded through a built-in 2.8" floppy disk called the Quick Disk drive.

Power
The unit runs on AC power only

References

External links
An extensive archive of S-10 samples
Roland S-10 (1086)
Replacement parts for all of the S Sampler Series

S-10
Virtual analog synthesizers
Polyphonic synthesizers
Products introduced in 1986
Samplers (musical instrument)
Japanese brands